Melchor Daguines Diclas is a Filipino politician from the province of Benguet in the Philippines. He currently serves as the Governor of Benguet. A physician by profession, he was first elected as Governor of the province in 2019.

References

External links
Province of Benguet Official Website

Living people
People from Benguet
Governors of Benguet
PDP–Laban politicians
1973 births
Filipino medical doctors